Carabus torosus spinolae is a subspecies of black-coloured beetle in the family Carabidae that is endemic to Turkey.

References

torosus spinolae
Beetles described in 1837
Endemic fauna of Turkey